The Manumuskin River is a  tributary of the Maurice River in Cumberland County, New Jersey in the United States.

The Manumuskin River flows through a relatively pristine forested area in the southern Pine Barrens of Cumberland County, as well as Atlantic white cedar bogs and salt marshes in its lower reaches. The name is of Lenape origin.

Approximately  of the watershed of the river are included in the Manumuskin River Preserve, established in 1983, the largest conservancy of its kind in New Jersey. Parts of the river are also designed as part of the Maurice Wild and Scenic River.

A local nonprofit organization, Citizens United to Protect the Maurice River and Its Tributaries, Inc., is a regional watershed organization that focuses its work on the Maurice River watershed, which includes the Manumuskin.

See also
 List of rivers of New Jersey

References

External links
 Cumberland Co., NJ: Manumuskin River Preserve
 National Park Service: Maurice Wild and Scenic River

Rivers of Cumberland County, New Jersey
Rivers of New Jersey
Tributaries of the Maurice River
Wild and Scenic Rivers of the United States